Phyllonorycter populicola is a moth of the family Gracillariidae. It is known from Tajikistan.

The larvae feed on Populus species, including Populus afghanica and Populus tadshikistanica. They probably mine the leaves of their host plant.

References

populicola
Moths of Asia
Moths described in 1975